Pavel Ivanovich Fonvizin (May 29, 1746 – April 24, 1803, in Moscow) was a Russian educator, scholar, and writer, who served as Rector for the Imperial Moscow University from 1784 to 1796. He was the younger brother of playwright Denis Fonvizin, and son of state councillor Ivan Fonvizin.

References 

1746 births
1803 deaths
Russian educators
Rectors of Moscow State University